Arm DDT is a commercial C, C++ and Fortran 90 debugger produced by Allinea Software now part of Arm of Warwick, United Kingdom. It is widely used for debugging parallel Message Passing Interface (MPI) and threaded (pthread or OpenMP) programs, including those running on clusters of Linux machines.

Debugger
It is used to find bugs on both small and large clusters, from 1 to 100,000s of processors.  It features memory debugging which detect memory leaks, or reading and writing beyond the bounds of arrays.

It was the first debugger to be able to debug petascale applications - having been used to debug applications running concurrently on 220,000 processes on a Cray XT5 at Oak Ridge National Laboratories. This is possible interactively as the debugger's control tree architecture leads to logarithmic performance for most collective operations. Arm DDT uses the GNU Debugger as debug engine.

Arm DDT also supports coprocessor architectures such as Intel Xeon Phi coprocessors and Nvidia CUDA GPUs.

It is part of Arm Forge - a suite of tools for developing code in high performance computing - which also includes the performance profiler for scalar, multithreaded and parallel codes - Arm MAP.

, 80 percent of the world's top 25 supercomputers on the TOP500 list, use Arm's tools.

Notes

External links
Allinea Software
Allinea DDT product page
Virtual Institute for High Productivity Supercomputing Allinea DDT guide

Debuggers